Quinto Piso Tour was a worldwide concert tour by Guatemalan singer–songwriter Ricardo Arjona, in support of his eleventh studio album, Quinto Piso.

The tour visited the United States, Spain, Argentina, Guatemala, Colombia, Venezuela, Mexico, Honduras, Puerto Rico, El Salvador, Canada, Peru, Dominican Republic, Costa Rica, Panamá, Chile, Uruguay, Bolivia and Paraguay. The concert had 91 shows throughout 2009 and 19 shows in 2010 for a total of 110 shows, beginning in Mexico on March 26, 2009 and ending in Bolivia on June 18, 2010.

During the first North American leg of the tour, Arjona expressed interest in singing in Cuba, showing no political commitments for the matter, a clear reference of the event colombian singer Juanes was planning on that country in 2009. Later that year, Arjona cancelled the planning of a concert in the country, and spoke heavily about Juanes' charity concert influence on the decision.

The Quinto Piso Tour has been one of the most successful tours made by a Latin artist, with an attendance of more than one million people from 19 countries. Also, Arjona received in 2010 a Billboard Latin Music Award for "Latin Tour of the Year".

Tour dates

Next, the tour dates for the Quinto Piso Tour:

Box office

References

2009 concert tours
2010 concert tours
Ricardo Arjona concert tours